Steiger's was a department store company of New England in the 19th and 20th centuries. Founded in Holyoke, Massachusetts in 1896, its flagship store for much of the company's history was in Springfield, Massachusetts. At the time of its purchase by May Department Stores, Steiger's was described as the last family-owned chain of department stores in New England.

History

Albert Steiger (1860–1938) was born in Ravensburg, Germany, on May 12, 1860, the eldest child of Jacob and Mary (née Felerabend) Steiger. His grandfather, John Ulrich Steiger, was a Swiss-born manufacturer of muslin who emigrated to the United States following the death of his wife and set up a bedspread manufacturing business in Huntington. In 1869 Albert Steiger and his parents would move to the United States as well, joining the family firm. Two years later however, John Steiger died, and by 1873 Albert Steiger's father and uncle had as well. At the age of 13 Steiger became the breadwinner in his family, looking after a widowed mother and two younger sisters. For the better part of 20 years he supported himself and his family by purchasing dry goods from a Mr. Darwin Gillett of Westfield, reselling and delivering these goods to the Hilltowns at a profit.

In 1894, at the age of 34, Steiger left Massachusetts and relocated to Port Chester, New York, north of New York City, where he opened his first dry goods store for a short time. In 1896, he would return to Western Massachusetts and found his namesake department store in Holyoke, Massachusetts under the name The Albert Steiger Company, which quickly became a mainstay in that city.

Around the turn of the 20th century, he opened a series of stores in Fall River, Massachusetts, New Bedford, Massachusetts, and Springfield, Massachusetts. A store in Hartford, Connecticut followed in 1918. By his death in 1938, Steiger's branches in western New York and New England brought in an estimated gross revenue of $25,000,000, equivalent to more than $450 million dollars in 2020 USD.

The five-story art deco downtown Springfield store was the chain's flagship during the mid-to-late 20th century. In contrast to Springfield's other main store, traditional full-service department store Forbes & Wallace, Steiger's concentrated more on being a high-end clothing store.

The Holyoke store, built in 1899, was a four-story beaux arts building designed by George P. B. Alderman, on High Street across from City Hall. The former department store building is still in use as offices today. Several generations of the Steiger family carried on this business. Albert Steiger's grandson, Albert E. Steiger Jr., was president of the company from to 1959 to 1992.

Over time, the freestanding downtown stores were closed and replaced with rented outlets in malls. The Hartford store was sold in 1962, leaving just the Springfield and Holyoke locations as traditional downtown department stores. Mall outlets were opened in the Longmeadow Shops (1961), Springfield Plaza (1964), Friendly Shops at Westfield, Massachusetts (1965), Eastfield Mall  (1967), Enfield Square Mall (1972), Hampshire Mall in Hadley, Massachusetts (1978), and Holyoke Mall at Ingleside (1979).

Steiger's was taken over by The May Department Stores Company in 1994 and the company and brand ceased to exist. The Eastfield Mall store, for instance, was replaced by a Filene's, then in 2006 by a Macy's before being closed in 2016. The downtown Springfield store closed in 1995 and the building was torn down soon after. A park now occupies the site.

See also
 Forbes & Wallace, another defunct department store with a flagship location in Springfield, Massachusetts

Notes

References

External links
 Albert Steiger Co, The Department Store Museum
"Claiming and Quantifying Space", a chapter of From Main to High: Consumers, Class, and the Spatial Reorientation of an Industrial City, whose subject is Holyoke, Massachusetts. The linked chapter discusses (among other subjects) Steiger's role in the city

1896 establishments in Massachusetts
1994 disestablishments in Massachusetts
Defunct clothing retailers of the United States
Defunct department stores based in Massachusetts
Retail companies established in 1896
Retail companies disestablished in 1995
Companies based in Holyoke, Massachusetts
Companies based in Springfield, Massachusetts
May Department Stores
Macy's